Baius may refer to:
Michael Baius, Catholic theologian
Băiuş, a village in the Leova district, Moldova
Baius (Odyssey) (Baîos), Odysseus's helmsman in Homer's Odyssey, namesake of Baiae